The 1916 United States Senate elections in Arizona took place on November 7, 1916. Incumbent Democratic U.S. Senator Henry F. Ashurst ran for reelection to a second term, defeating Republican former Territorial Governor Joseph H. Kibbey in the general election by a comfortable margin.

Democratic primary

Candidates
 Henry F. Ashurst, incumbent U.S. Senator

Republican primary

Candidates
 Joseph H. Kibbey, former Territorial Governor of Arizona
 William H. Stilwell, former Associate Justice of the Arizona Territorial Supreme Court

Results

General election

See also 
 United States Senate elections, 1916 and 1917

References

1916
Arizona
United States Senate